Highbury Park is a public park located in Moseley, Birmingham, UK. The estate of Highbury Hall, the former residence of Joseph Chamberlain, stands on the park's northern edge.

Before his death in 1914, he bequeathed the park to the people of Birmingham. The park finally opened to the public in 1930.

Rangers are also available to host events and activities in the park. A picnic area also lies in the park.

References

External links
 Highbury Park Friends
 

Parks and open spaces in Birmingham, West Midlands